Crowfield may refer to:

Places
Crowfield, Gloucestershire, England
Crowfield, Northamptonshire, England
Crowfield, Suffolk, England
Crowfield, Monmouthshire, Wales

See also
Crowfield Airfield, Suffolk, England
Crowfield Windmill, Suffolk, England
Crowfield Historic District, a small residential historic district in North Kingstown, Rhode Island, USA
Crowfields Common, Local Nature Reserve in Moulton, Northamptonshire, England